The Richard was a 70-gun second-rate ship of the line of the navy of the Commonwealth of England, built by the Master Shipwright Christopher Pett at Woolwich Dockyard, and launched in 1658. She was named after Richard Cromwell, to honour his appointment as the Protector in succession to his late father Oliver Cromwell.

After the Restoration of the monarchy in 1660, her name was changed to HMS Royal James, and she was re-registered as a first rate ship of the line in the Royal Navy.  This involved adding gunports in the waist on the upper deck, where previously she had carried no guns, and consequently her rating was raised to 82 guns.

She took part in all three major naval battles of the Second Dutch War. At the Battle of Lowestoft on 3 June 1665, she was the flagship of Prince Rupert, a role she reprised a year later during the Four Days Battle on 4 June 1666.  She also took part in the St James's Day Fight on 25 July 1666.

She was present at the raid on the Medway in 1667, where first she was sunk to prevent capture, and then those parts above water burnt by the Dutch fireships.

Notes

References

 Lavery, Brian (2003) The Ship of the Line - Volume 1: The development of the battlefleet 1650-1850. Conway Maritime Press. .

Ships of the line of the Royal Navy
1650s ships
Shipwrecks of England
Maritime incidents in 1667